Alfred H. Moses (born July 24, 1929) is an American attorney and diplomat who served as the U.S. Ambassador to Romania from 1994 to 1997.

Biography
Moses was born and raised in Baltimore, Maryland. After graduating from Baltimore City College  (a high school), he attended Dartmouth College from which he received his B.A. degree in 1951. He attended Princeton University's Woodrow Wilson School in 1951-52, served in the U.S. Navy, and received his law degree from Georgetown University in 1956, where he was an editor of the Georgetown Law Review.

Moses joined the Washington, D.C., law firm of Covington & Burling practicing in the areas of litigation, corporate and securities matters, and arbitration. He represented clients in important litigation as trial and appellant counsel and has structured major corporate, financial and real estate transactions in this country and abroad. Except for his public service, he has remained with Covington & Burling. He also serves as chief strategy officer of Promontory Financial Group, a global financial services consulting firm, and is vice chairman of the Promontory Interfinancial Network, a fintech company based in Arlington, Virginia.

Moses was lead counsel to President Jimmy Carter in the "Billygate" hearings in the U.S. Senate. He served as Special Advisor and Special Counsel to President Carter, 1980-81. Under President Bill Clinton, Moses was U.S. Ambassador to Romania, 1994–97, and Special Presidential Emissary for the Cyprus problem 1999-2001. In 2002, he was awarded Romania's Mare Cruce Medal (Order For Merit) by the President of Romania, Ion Iliescu, the only American to have been so honored.

Moses has published numerous articles on Central European and Middle East issues in The New York Times, International Herald Tribune, The Washington Post, The Christian Science Monitor and other publications.

He has been active in religious life and served as President of the American Jewish Committee in 1991–1995.

In July 2018, he published his book Bucharest Diary: An American Ambassador’s Journey.

References

External links
Bucharest Diary: Romania's Journey from Darkness to Light by Alfred H. Moses (Brookings Institution Press), on Amazon.com
Do Human Rights Matter? Ambassador Alfred H Moses at Geneva Summit 2017, on UN Watch, March 5, 2017.

1929 births
Living people
Ambassadors of the United States to Romania
United States Senate lawyers
Jewish American attorneys
Princeton School of Public and International Affairs alumni
Dartmouth College alumni
Georgetown University Law Center alumni
Lawyers from Washington, D.C.
Baltimore City College alumni
Lawyers from Baltimore
People associated with Covington & Burling
21st-century American Jews
American Jewish Committee